The Leica M2 is a 35 mm rangefinder camera by Ernst Leitz GmbH of Wetzlar, Germany,  introduced in 1957. Around 82,000 M2s were produced between 1957 and 1968. Around 1500 M2s were produced by Ernst Leitz Canada, but most of these are not marked as such on the top plate.

Comparisons
The M2 was considered to be a more affordable, simplified version of the 1954 Leica M3. Notably, the frame counter of the M2 was composed of a disk plate beneath the film advance lever that had to be manually reset to zero after reloading. This system was close to that of the Leica III series, and unlike that of the M3, which is an independent frame counter, visible through a window in the top plate, that automatically resets to zero when the film take-up spool is removed.

The rangefinder system was also simplified from that of the M3 and this made it potentially more prone to rangefinder flare. The M2 has a rangefinder with a 0.72 magnification and framelines for 35, 50 and 90mm lenses instead of the 0.91 magnification and 50, 90 and 135mm framelines of the M3. This made it better suited for photojournalists who favour shorter lenses or for spectacle-wearers using a 50mm lens who sometimes find it difficult to see the framelines on the M3. The ground glass frameline illumination window of the M3 was replaced with a fresnel-type plastic lens.  Finally, the ornate beveling around the various windows on the front of the M3 were flattened on the body of the M2. Unlike the M3, the widest framelines were not always visible so only one set of framelines were ever displayed at one time. All M2s are single stroke advance.

The M2 was followed by the still simpler Leica M1 and then the Leica M4, which used a similar rangefinder design but re-introduced the M3 style frame counter and added a faster loading system and a canted rewind lever.

On the present-day used market the M2, originally intended to be more "affordable", sells at prices only slightly lower than the M3.  Both cameras are made to a similar level of quality, and the M2's framelines have proved to be more versatile over time, with all subsequent Leica rangefinder models having 35mm framelines included.

Variations 
There are a number of variations of the Leica M2. Although most models have the self-timer lever, it is absent from some earlier models. Also, some early models have a film rewind push-button instead of the typical lever. About 2400 M2s were factory-painted black, but these are relatively rare and more valued by collectors. Near the end of production, Leica also produced a number of M2-R models, which had the faster loading system of the later Leica M4.

Gallery

External links 

 Leica M2 on photoethnography.com
 Leica M Serial Numbers on Cameraquest.com

M2
Leica rangefinder cameras

de:Leica M2